The 1947–48 Tercera División was the 12th edition of the Spanish national third tier.

Format 
8 geographic groups of 14 clubs (112 in total) participated. The 8 group champions qualified for the Fase Intermedia which comprised 2 groups of four clubs playing a round robin. The group winners and runners up qualified for the Fase_Final which was another round robin with the top two clubs earning promotion to Segunda División.

Group 1

Group 2

Group 3

Group 4

Group 5

Group 6 

Note: Manchego were reprieved following the resignation of other clubs.

Group 7

Group 8

Fase Intermedia

Group I

Group II

Tercera División Fase Final

Permanencia Tercera División

Group I

Group II

Note: Numancia and Dep. Alavés were reprieved following the resignation of other teams.

Group III

Note: Conquense were reprieved following the resignation of other teams.

Group IV

External links
 Official LFP Site
Research by Asociación para la Recopilación de Estadísticas del Fútbol (AREFE)
 

Tercera División seasons
3
Spain